Anonychomyrma angusta is a species of ant in the genus Anonychomyrma. Described by Stitz in 1911, the species is endemic to New Guinea.

References

Anonychomyrma
Insects of New Guinea
Insects described in 1911
Endemic fauna of New Guinea